KART (1400 AM) is a radio station broadcasting a classic country format. Licensed to Jerome, Idaho, United States, the station serves the Twin Falls area. The station is currently owned by Lee Family Broadcasting and is also heard on translator K234CT, licensed to Twin Falls on 94.7 FM.

References

External links

FCC History Cards for KART

ART (AM)
Classic country radio stations in the United States
Radio stations established in 1956